Power is the fifth studio album by Scottish alternative rock band Twin Atlantic. It was released on 24 January 2020.

Track listing

Critical reception
{{Album ratings
|MC=61/100
|rev1=DIY
|rev1score=
|rev2=The Guardian
|rev2score=
|rev3=Kerrang!
|rev3score=
|rev4=NME|rev4score=
}}Power'' was met with generally favorable reviews from critics. At Metacritic, which assigns a weighted average rating out of 100 to reviews from mainstream publications, this release received an average score of 61, based on 6 reviews.

Charts

See also
List of 2020 albums

References 

2020 albums
Twin Atlantic albums
Virgin EMI Records albums
Albums produced by Dan Austin